Le Locle-Col-des-Roches railway station is a railway station in the municipality of Le Locle, in the Swiss canton of Neuchâtel. The station is located just short of the border between France and Switzerland and is served by French trains only.

Services
The following services stop at Le Locle-Col-des-Roches:

References

External links 
 
 

Railway stations in the canton of Neuchâtel
Swiss Federal Railways stations